Pholidobolus hillisi is a species of lizard in the family Gymnophthalmidae. It is endemic to Ecuador.

References

Pholidobolus
Reptiles of Ecuador
Endemic fauna of Ecuador
Reptiles described in 2014
Taxa named by Omar Torres-Carvajal
Taxa named by Pablo J. Venegas
Taxa named by Simón E. Lobos
Taxa named by Paola Mafla-Endara
Taxa named by Pedro M. Sales-Nunes